The Free Catholic Church in Germany is a Christian religious community in Germany which was legally registered in 1987.

Johannes Peter Meyer-Mendez brought the Brazilian Catholic Apostolic Church (ICAB) to Germany in 1949. It was registered as the Free Catholic Church ("Freikatholische Kirche").

After Meyer-Mendez died,  became the leader, then Hilarios Karl-Heinz Ungerer became the leader and moved from Cologne to Munich.

In 1972, Ungerer opened a storefront church in Munich.

Notes

References

Independent Catholic denominations
Christian organizations established in 1949
Christian denominations established in the 20th century